Evanston Public Library is both a public library facility and a city department in Evanston, Illinois, United States.

History 
The Evanston Library Association was founded in 1870. The library itself was established in 1873 and Thomas J. Kellan was appointed the library's first librarian in 1874. In 1893 the library moved to the second floor of the new Village Hall in 1893 and the library's collection was reorganized according to the new Dewey Decimal Classification system in 1896. In 1908 the library moved to its current location at 1703 Orrington Avenue.

Two additional branches were later added – the South Branch (at 900 Chicago Avenue) in 1917 and the North Branch (at 2026 Central Street) in 1952 and in 1958 the City Planning Commission approved a proposal for a new building at Church and Orrington.

In 1980, the library made online public access available to its patrons along with the introduction of two new rental options: the videocassette and duplicates of best selling books.

The library moved into its newly finished building in 1994 and the library celebrated its 125th anniversary in 1998.

Branches 

The Evanston Public Library has three branches: the Main Branch at 1703 Orrington Avenue; the North Branch at 2026 Central Street and the South Branch at 900 Chicago Avenue. The North and South branches were shut down in late 2020.

In March 2011, the Mighty Twig volunteer-run library opened at 900 Chicago Avenue in Evanston, "as an experiment by Evanston Public Library Friends in response to the closing of the South Branch."  Then, in August-September, 2012, the Evanston Public Library's Board voted to "begin formalizing relations with The Mighty Twig."

Special features

Children's room

Recently remodeled; the new children's section of the library offers a fun and interactive environment for kids of all ages. Also available for children are a number of kid-friendly programs and activities that the library has featured everyday, from storytime to art projects.

The Loft

In 2007 the Evanston Public Library opened the Teen Loft, a space dedicated specifically to teenage library users. The Loft offers a space for teenagers to study, read, or relax after a long day at school. Computers, WiFi, 3D Printers, and plenty of couches are available as well as private study rooms for those who need the quiet. 

The Loft offers an array of programming aimed specifically at Teens with a special emphasis on STEM activities. The Loft also runs a successful Gender/Sexuality Alliance that encourages LGBTQIA+ community building, advocacy, and education. In addition to programming the staff at The Loft works closely with ETHS, District 65, Y.O.U., and many other community enrichment groups to help ensure the success of Evanston teens. 

In recent news, the Loft's design team has won the biennial American Library Association/International Interior Design Association interior design award. The award honors libraries that demonstrate artistic creativity with their choice of design, aesthetics and overall client satisfaction.

Peregrine falcons

2008 was the fourth year in a row that peregrine falcons chose to nest atop a column on the library. The adult falcons, along with four babies born in 2006, can be seen from both outside and inside of the library. One can follow the falcon's many adventures on the FalconCam.

Classes and programs

Computer classes

The library offers a variety of free classes that teach students how to use and understand certain computer techniques such as using the mouse and navigating the internet. Registration is required. Classes featured in 2008 are: Computer Basics, Intro to the Internet, Intro to Email, and Internet Practice.

African American Literature Book Group

Once a month, a group gets together to discuss pre-chosen books written by African American authors.

Book sales

For those wishing to purchase an item, the library has a Book Sale occurring on the library's Main Floor. The library accepts donations of books, tapes/CDs, old maps, old postcards, children's books, and magazines.

Art on display
The library has a variety of different art forms all over the library. Prominently displayed occupying several stories of the entry is "Ghostwriter" – a suspended wire sculpture by Ralph Helmick and Stuart Schechter that can  be seen from every floor of the library.

References

External links 

 
 Evanston Public Library Friends and Might Twig website

Buildings and structures in Evanston, Illinois
Public libraries in Illinois
Libraries in Cook County, Illinois
Tourist attractions in Evanston, Illinois
Library buildings completed in 1994
1873 establishments in Illinois